Amenas may refer to:
In Amenas, town and municipality in eastern Algeria
In Amenas District, district in Illizi Province, Algeria
In Amenas Airport, airport in eastern Algeria

See also
In Amenas hostage crisis, a 2013 incident in eastern Algeria
Amena (disambiguation)